Comal County is a county located on the Edwards Plateau in the U.S. state of Texas. As of the 2020 census, its population was 161,501. Comal County is known for its rich German-Texan and European history. Its county seat is New Braunfels.

Comal County is part of the San Antonio-New Braunfels, TX metropolitan statistical area.

Along with Hays and Kendall Counties, Comal was listed in 2017 of the nation's 10 fastest-growing large counties with a population of at least 10,000. In 2017, Comal County was second on the list; it grew by 5,675 newcomers, or 4.4% from 2015 to 2016. Kendall County was the second-fastest growing county in the nation in 2015 to 2016, grew by 5.16%. Hays County, third on the national list, had nearly 10,000 new residents during the year. As a result of this growth, the counties have experienced new home construction, traffic congestion, and greater demand for public services. Bexar County, which includes San Antonio, grew by 1.75% during the year, but its number of new residents exceeded 33,000.

History

 Early native American inhabitants include Tonkawa, Waco, Karankawa and Lipan Apache.
 1700-1758 The area becomes known as “Comal”, Spanish for “flat dish”. Nuestra Senora de Guadalupe Mission at Comal Springs.
 1825 Coahuila y Tejas issues land grant for Comal Springs to Juan Martín de Veramendi.
 1842 Adelsverein organized in Germany to promote emigration to Texas. Fisher-Miller Land Grant sets aside three million acres (12,000 km2) to settle 600 families and single men of German, Dutch, Swiss, Danish, Swedish, and Norwegian ancestry in Texas.
 1844, June 26 - Henry Francis Fisher sells interest in land grant to Adelsverein
Thousands of German immigrants are stranded at port of disembarkation Indianaola on Matagorda Bay. With no food or shelters, living in holes dug into the ground, an estimated 50% die from disease or starvation. The living begin to walk to their destinations hundreds of miles away. 200 German colonists who walked from Indianola found the town of New Braunfels at the crossing of the San Antonio-Nacogdches Road on the Guadalupe River. John O. Meusebach arrives in Galveston.
 1846 March - Texas legislature forms Comal County from the Eighth Precinct of Bexar County.  New Braunfels is the county seat.
 1850 Survey of 130 German farms in Comal reveals no slave laborers.
 1852 Neu-Braunfelser Zeitung begins publication, initially only in German, deriving its name 16th Century Germany's prototype of a newspaper titled Zeitung.
 1854  County is divided into eight public school districts. The Texas State Convention of Germans meet in San Antonio and adopt a political, social and religious platform, including: 1) Equal pay for equal work; 2) Direct election of the President of the United States; 3) Abolition of capital punishment; 4)  “Slavery is an evil, the abolition of which is a requirement of democratic principles..”; 5) Free schools – including universities - supported by the state, without religious influence; and 6) Total separation of church and state.
 1858  Final county boundaries determination with the separation of part of western Comal County to Blanco and Kendall counties. New Braunfels votes in a school tax.
 1861 Comal County votes for secession from the Union. Contributes three all-German volunteer companies to the Confederate cause.
 1887 Faust Street Bridge built over the Guadalupe River.
 1898 Comal County limestone courthouse erected.  Romanesque Revival style.  Architect James Riely Gordon.
 1920s - County establishes itself as a manufacturing and shipping center for textiles, garments, flour, and construction materials.
 1960 Four students at St. Mary's University San Antonio discover Natural Bridge Caverns, the largest known commercial caverns in the state of Texas.
 1961 Comal's first Wurstfest draws a crowd of 2,000.
 1964 Canyon Lake impoundment, boosting tourism and related industries.

Darmstadt Society of Forty

Count Castell of the Adelsverein negotiated with the separate Darmstadt Society of Forty to colonize 200 families on the Fisher–Miller Land Grant territory in Texas.  In return, they were to receive $12,000 in money, livestock, and equipment, and provisions for a year.  After the first year, the colonies were expected to support themselves. The colonies attempted were Castell, Leiningen, Bettina, Schoenburg, and Meerholz in Llano County; Darmstädler Farm in Comal County; and Tusculum in Kendall County. Of these, only Castell survives. The colonies failed after the Adelsverein funding expired, and also due to conflict of structure and authorities. Some members moved to other Adelsverein settlements in Texas.  Others moved elsewhere, or returned to Germany.

Geography

The Balcones Escarpment runs northeastward through the county, generally just west of Interstate 35.  West of the escarpment are the rocky hills and canyons of the Texas Hill Country; to the east are the rolling grasslands of the coastal plains.

The Guadalupe River flows generally southeastward through the county, and is impounded by Canyon Lake.  The Comal River rises from the Comal Springs in New Braunfels, and quickly joins the Guadalupe River.

Adjacent counties
 Blanco County (north)
 Hays County (northeast)
 Guadalupe County (southeast)
 Bexar County (southwest)
 Kendall County (northwest)

Transportation

Major highways
  Interstate 35
  U.S. Highway 281
  State Highway 46

Airports

  New Braunfels
  Spring Branch (Kestrel)

Demographics

Note: the US Census treats Hispanic/Latino as an ethnic category. This table excludes Latinos from the racial categories and assigns them to a separate category. Hispanics/Latinos can be of any race.

As of the census of 2010, there were 108,472 people, 29,066 households, and 21,886 families residing in the county. The population density was 139 people per square mile (54/km2). There were 32,718 housing units at an average density of 58 per square mile (22/km2). The racial makeup of the county was 89.08% White, 0.95% Black or African American, 0.53% Native American, 0.46% Asian, 0.03% Pacific Islander, 6.98% from other races, and 1.96% from two or more races. 22.57% of the population were Hispanic or Latino of any race.

There were 29,066 households, out of which 33.30% had children under the age of 18 living with them, 62.80% were married couples living together, 9.00% had a female householder with no husband present, and 24.70% were non-families. 20.60% of all households were made up of individuals, and 9.00% had someone living alone who was 65 years of age or older. The average household size was 2.64 and the average family size was 3.05.

A Williams Institute analysis of 2010 census data found there were about 4.4 same-sex couples per 1,000 households in the county.

In the county, the population was spread out, with 25.50% under the age of 18, 7.00% from 18 to 24, 27.50% from 25 to 44, 25.20% from 45 to 64, and 14.80% who were 65 years of age or older. The median age was 39 years. For every 100 females, there were 96.00 males. For every 100 females age 18 and over, there were 93.20 males.

The median income for a household in the county was $46,147, and the median income for a family was $52,455. Males had a median income of $36,048 versus $25,940 for females. The per capita income for the county was $21,914. About 6.40% of families and 8.60% of the population were below the poverty line, including 11.50% of those under age 18 and 7.30% of those age 65 or over.

Politics
Comal is a strongly Republican county: the last Democrat to carry it being Lyndon B. Johnson in 1964, and no others have done so since Franklin Roosevelt’s 1936 landslide when he won every Texas county bar traditionally Unionist Gillespie and Kendall and took 87.31 percent of the Lone Star State’s vote. In earlier periods, the county’s German heritage meant it often deviated from “Solid South” Democratic voting: in 1924 Robert M. La Follette won 73.96 percent of Comal County’s vote (versus 6.52 percent for all of Texas), which made it his strongest county nationwide, and in 1920 American candidate James “Pa” Ferguson carried the county with 841 votes to 765 for Warren G. Harding.

The county is part of the 21st District in the United States House of Representatives, represented by Republican Chip Roy, the 25th district of the Texas State Senate, represented by Republican Donna Campbell, and the 73rd District of the Texas House of Representatives and is represented by Republican Carrie Isaac.

Communities

Cities (multiple counties)
 Fair Oaks Ranch (partly in Bexar and Kendall counties)
 New Braunfels (county seat) (mostly in Comal County but also in Guadalupe County)
 San Antonio (mostly in Bexar County and a small part in Medina County)
 Schertz (partly in Guadalupe and Bexar counties)
 Selma (mostly in Bexar and Guadalupe counties)

Cities
 Bulverde
 Garden Ridge
 Spring Branch

Census-designated place
 Canyon Lake

Other unincorporated communities
 Bracken
 Fischer

Ghost towns
 Canyon City
 Wesson

Education
School districts in Comal County:
 Boerne Independent School District
 Comal Independent School District
 New Braunfels Independent School District
 Wimberley Independent School District

All of the county is in the service area of Alamo Community College District.

In popular culture
 The Randy Rogers Band song "Comal County Line" is about the county.
 The Jason Boland song "Comal County Blue" is about the county.

See also

 Comal County Sheriff's Office
 Adelsverein
 German Texan
 Honey Creek (Texas)
 List of museums in Central Texas
 National Register of Historic Places listings in Comal County, Texas
 Recorded Texas Historic Landmarks in Comal County

References

External links
 Library of Congress Historic American Buildings Survey (Comal Co)
 Comal County government’s website 
 
 Canyon Lake Area Chamber of Commerce
 Historic materials from Comal County, hosted by the Portal to Texas History

 
1846 establishments in Texas
Populated places established in 1846
Greater San Antonio
German-American history
Texas Hill Country